Hal Reeve (born c. 1933) is a former Canadian football player who played for the Calgary Stampeders. He played college football at the University of Oregon.

References

Living people
1930s births
Canadian football ends
Calgary Stampeders players
Oregon Ducks football players
Place of birth missing (living people)